Mallet Creek may refer to:

Mallet Creek, Ohio, an unincorporated community
Mallet Creek (Ohio), a stream